The Royal Palace of Caserta is a former royal residence in Caserta, southern Italy, constructed by the House of Bourbon-Two Sicilies as their main residence as kings of Naples. It is the largest palace erected in Europe during the 18th century. In 1997, the palace was designated a UNESCO World Heritage Site; its nomination described it as "the swan song of the spectacular art of the Baroque, from which it adopted all the features needed to create the illusions of multidirectional space". The Royal Palace of Caserta is the largest former royal residence in the world, over 2 million m3 in volume  and covering an area of 47,000 m2.

History

The construction of the palace began in 1752 for Charles VII of Naples (Charles III of Spain), who worked closely with his architect, Luigi Vanvitelli. When Charles saw Vanvitelli's grandly scaled model for Caserta, it filled him with emotion "fit to tear his heart from his breast". In the end, he never slept a night at the Reggia, as he abdicated in 1759 to become King of Spain, and the project was carried to only partial completion for his third son and successor, Ferdinand IV of Naples.

The political and social model for Vanvitelli's palace was Versailles, which, though strikingly different in its variety and disposition, solves similar problems of assembling and providing for the king, court, and government in a massive building with the social structure of a small city, confronting a baroque view of a highly subordinated nature, la nature forcée. This was part of the entire concept of the palace when Mario Gioffredo first proposed it in 1750. According to Hersey, the proposal envisaged a palace "that was a virtual city, housing not just the court and king but all the main political and cultural elites of the Kingdom of the Two Sicilies - university, museum, library, cabinet bureaus, military high commands, and so on."

The population of Caserta Vecchia was moved  to provide a workforce closer to the palace. A silk factory at San Leucio resort was disguised as a pavilion in the immense parkland.

Another of the king's primary objectives was to have a magnificent new royal court and administrative center for the kingdom in a location protected from sea attack and distant from the revolt-prone and congested city of Naples. Troop barracks were housed within the palace to provide the king with suitable protection.

The Royal Palace of Madrid, where Charles had grown up, which had been devised by Filippo Juvarra for Charles' father, Philip V of Spain, and Charlottenburg Palace provided models. A spacious octagonal vestibule seems to have been inspired by Basilica di Santa Maria della Salute in Venice, while the palatine chapel is most often compared to the Royal Chapel at Versailles. Vanvitelli died in 1773: the construction was continued by his son Carlo and then by other architects; but the elder Vanvitelli's original project, which included a vast pair of frontal wings similar to Bernini's wings at St. Peter's, was never finished.

From 1923 to 1943, the palace was the location of the Accademia Aeronautica, the Italian Air Force Academy. From 1943, during the allied invasion, the royal palace served as Allied Force Headquarters for the Supreme Allied Commander in the Mediterranean area; Sir Maitland Wilson, and later Sir Harold Alexander. In April 1945, the palace was the site of the signing of the unconditional surrender of German forces in Italy. The agreement covered between 600,000 and 900,000 soldiers along the Italian Front, including troops in sections of Austria. The first Allied war crimes trial took place in the palace in 1945; German general Anton Dostler was sentenced to death and executed nearby, in Aversa. In the left-hand arc behind the façade, a set of barracks was built. During World War II, the soldiers of the US Fifth Army recovered here in a "rest center".

In 1998, the palace was a filming location for Star Wars: Episode One - The Phantom Menace, specifically as the interior of the Theed City Naboo Palace. It was used as a location for four days after it had been closed to visitors. Scenes with explosions were filmed on replica sets in Leavesden Studios to avoid damaging the actual palace.

Layout of the Palace
The palace has five floors, 1,200 rooms, including two dozen state apartments, 1742 windows, 34 staircases, 1026 fireplaces, a large library, and a theatre modelled after the Teatro San Carlo of Naples. A monumental avenue running 20 kilometers between the palace and Naples was planned but never realized.

The palace has a rectangular plan, measuring 247 × 184 m, and the four sides are connected by two orthogonal arms, forming four inner courts.

Behind the façades of its matching segmental ranges of outbuildings that flank the giant forecourt, a jumble of buildings arose to facilitate daily business. The palace encloses four courts that feature what scholars describe as a well-proportioned interior that evokes a monotonous dignity unique in its time.

Of all the royal residences inspired by the Palace of Versailles, the Reggia of Caserta is the one that bears the greatest resemblance to the original model: the unbroken balustraded skyline and the slight break provided by pavilions within the long, somewhat monotonous façade. As at Versailles, a large aqueduct was required to bring water for the prodigious water displays. Like its French predecessor, the palace was intended to display the power and grandeur of an absolute Bourbon monarchy. A solecism at Caserta is that above the piano reale, the King's floor, is another floor of equal magnificence. The enfilades of Late Baroque saloni were the heart and seat of government, as well as displays of national wealth. Caserta provided a royal refuge from the dust and factions of the capital, just as Versailles had freed Louis XIV from Paris. The royal palace has more than 40 monumental rooms completely decorated with frescoes when, in comparison, Versailles counts only 22 monumental rooms.

The Park
The garden, a typical example of the Baroque extension of formal vistas, stretches for 120 ha, partly on hilly terrain. It is also inspired by the park of Versailles. The park starts from the back façade of the palace, flanking a long alley with artificial fountains and cascades. There is a botanical garden called "The English Garden", in the upper part designed in the 1780s by Carlo Vanvitelli and the German-born botanist, nurseryman, plantsman-designer, John Graefer, trained in London and recommended to Sir William Hamilton by Sir Joseph Banks. It is an early Continental example of an "English garden" in the svelte naturalistic taste of Capability Brown.

The fountains and cascades, each filling a vasca (basin), with architecture and hydraulics by Luigi Vanvitelli at intervals along a wide straight canal that runs to the horizon, rivalled those at Peterhof outside St. Petersburg. These include:
The Fountain of Diana and Actaeon (sculptures by Paolo Persico, Angelo Maria Brunelli, and Tommaso Solari);
The Fountain of Venus and Adonis (1770–80);
The Fountain of the Dolphins (1773–80);
The Fountain of Aeolus;
The Fountain of Ceres.

Many figures from classical Antiquity were modelled by Gaetano Salomone for the gardens of the Reggia and executed by large workshops.

Contemporary observers noted that the Caserta surpassed all other European royal palaces, including its models, in one particular aspect: the combination of completeness and stateliness. This is attributed to the spacious oval piazza in front of the edifice's south side

Curiosity 
In 1861, with the birth of the Kingdom of Italy, Savoyan officials surveyed the contents of the Palace. The bidet was inventoried as follows: "strange object in the shape of a guitar".

UNESCO World Heritage site

The palace was listed as a world heritage site in 1997. According to the rationale, the palace, "whilst cast in the same mould as other 18th-century royal establishments, is exceptional for the broad sweep of its design, incorporating not only an imposing palace and park but also much of the surrounding natural landscape and an ambitious new town laid out according to the urban planning precepts of its time."

See also
 Asteroid 274246 Reggiacaserta
 List of Baroque residences

References

Further reading

Hersey, George. Architecture, Poetry, and Number in the Royal Palace at Caserta, (Cambridge: MIT Press) 1983. Caserta interpreted through the Neapolitan philosopher Giambattista Vico

External links

Caserta
Royal residences in the Kingdom of Naples
Buildings and structures in Caserta
Art museums and galleries in Campania
World Heritage Sites in Italy
Caserta
Neoclassical palaces
Neoclassical architecture in Campania
Italian Baroque gardens
Baroque palaces in Italy
Baroque architecture in Campania
Museums in Campania
Historic house museums in Italy
National museums of Italy
1780 establishments in the Kingdom of Naples
Luigi Vanvitelli buildings